Bemberg is a surname. Notable people with the surname include:

Carlos Miguens Bemberg (born 1949), Argentine businessman
Herman Bemberg (1859–1931), French musical composer
María Luisa Bemberg (1922–1995), pioneer feminist, film writer, director and actress born in Buenos Aires, Argentina
Otto Bemberg (1827–1896), German Argentine businessman prominent in the development of early Argentine industry
 A trade name for cuprammonium rayon, owned by the J. P. Bemberg company.